Davidson School (formerly Davidson Elementary School & Davidson High School) is a Canadian school in Davidson, Saskatchewan, administered within the Sun West School Division (SWSD). The name of the school sports team is the Davidson Raiders.

History

The first school opened in Davidson in 1903. The teacher, Harry Ketcheson, was paid for secretarial and janitorial services in addition to teaching. While younger students had continual use of this building during this time, older students used a variety of locations until the Board of Trustees chose a permanent location.

A two-story brick building was constructed in 1909 to provide room for all the students. By 1916, the older students had to return to using the original building to make room for the increasing student population.

The brick school burned to the ground in December 1916, resulting in the younger students displacing the older students once again. Senior classes were held for a time in the Town Hall.

In 1919, another school was constructed with room for K-6 on the first floor, and 7-12 on the second floor. It was built by Poole Construction, which is today known as PCL. It was probably designed by Regina architects Storey and Van Egmond.

The student population peaked in the 1960s and 1970s at around 250 students. During this era, Davidson Raiders won multiple provincial championships in football and volleyball.

Today, Davidson High has around 250 students from Grades K -12, with a teaching staff of 10.25 and a support staff of 6.

Despite a reduced enrolment due to rural depopulation and lower birth rates, DHS offers a variety of extracurricular activities. Athletics includes golf, volleyball, basketball, curling, badminton, and track and field. Science and drama clubs provide other optional activities. The year's events and activities are highlighted annually in the DHS Yearbook.

Davidson High students are noted for their high level of participation in sports and an aptitude for creative writing. The school also had developed a tradition for having an active outdoor education program.

External links
Davidson High School

High schools in Saskatchewan
Educational institutions established in 1903
1903 establishments in the Northwest Territories